Crash Investigation Unit is an Australian factual television series on the Seven Network hosted by Damian Walshe-Howling. The series premiered on 27 August 2008.

About The Show 
The series follows the Metropolitan Crash Investigation Unit in Sydney to uncover the causes behind a car crash. The program is similar to New Zealand's SCU: Serious Crash Unit, which has previously aired on Seven to strong ratings.

On 22 September 2008, Channel Seven confirmed it had commissioned a second series of Crash Investigation Unit.

Episodes

Season 1 (2008)

Season 2 (2010–11)

References

External links
Channel Seven official site
Greenstone Pictures
TVNZ
Kangoo - animators of CIU's vehicle collisions

Australian factual television series
Seven Network original programming
2008 Australian television series debuts
Documentary television series about policing
Television series by Greenstone TV